Kasey Giteau (born 20 September 1982) is a former competitive swimmer who represented Australia at the 2000 Summer Olympics in Sydney, Australia.  There she finished in 18th position in the 400-metre freestyle, clocking 4:15.54 in the qualifying heats.

External links
 Australian Olympic Committee

1982 births
Living people
Olympic swimmers of Australia
Swimmers at the 2000 Summer Olympics
Sportswomen from New South Wales
Swimmers from Sydney
Australian female freestyle swimmers